2011 Regional League Division 2 Northern Region is the third season of the League competition since its establishment in 2009. It is in the third tier of the Thai football league system. The league winners and runners up will qualify for the 2011 Regional League Division 2 championship stage.

Changes from last season

Team changes

Promoted clubs

Chiangmai and Chainat were promoted to the 2011 Thai Division 1 League.

Expansion clubs

Lamphun Warrior and Nan joined the newly expanded league setup.

Stadium and locations

League table

Results

References

External links
 Football Association of Thailand

Regional League Northern Division seasons
Nor